Hypostomus derbyi is a species of catfish in the family Loricariidae. It is native to South America, where it occurs in the basins of the Iguazu River and the Urugua-í River, which are both tributaries of the Paraná River. The species reaches 31 cm (12.2 inches) in standard length and is believed to be a facultative air-breather.

References 

Species described in 1911
Hypostominae